Cholomon or Cholomondas (sometimes transliterated as Holomontas) is a mountain in Central Macedonia, Greece, that covers almost all of central and east Chalkidiki. The ancient Greeks called the mountain Ypsison. It is covered by dense oak forest and is part of the Natura 2000 network. The highest peak rises northeast of Polygyros, which is the capital of Chalkidiki, to 1.165 metres and is the highest point of Chalkidiki.

See also
Rentina Gorge

Cholomon
Landforms of Chalkidiki
Cholomon
Rhodope mountain range